Super Hockey League, or Hockey Superleague or variation may refer to:

a "superleague" (ie. "elite league"): 
Ice hockey
 Ice hockey league at the pro-elite majors level
 Russian Superleague
 Ice Hockey Superleague, Britain
 Turkish Ice Hockey Super League
 East Coast Super League, NSW, Australia
 Super East Collegiate Hockey League, New England, USA; amateur varsity collegiate
 J20 SuperElit, Sweden, juniors
 EWHL Super Cup, women's Europe
 IIHF Super Cup, men's Europe
Field hockey
 Field hockey league at the pro-elite majors level

See also
 Super League (disambiguation)
 Elite League (disambiguation)
 Pakistan Hockey League
 Super Ice Hockey
 Super Hockey
 super cup